A. L. "Al" Burruss (July 3, 1927 – May 10, 1986) was an American politician. Burruss was a member of the Democratic party. From 1964 to 1986, he was a member of the Georgia House of Representatives. Burruss was the House majority leader, or the ranking Democrat, from 1982 until his death in 1986 from pancreatic cancer.

References

1927 births
1986 deaths
Democratic Party members of the Georgia House of Representatives
20th-century American politicians